Goran Bošković may refer to:

Goran Bošković (footballer born 1966), Montenegrin footballer
Goran Bošković (footballer born 1976), Serbian footballer
Goran Bošković (basketball) (born 1972), Montenegrin basketball coach and former player